Ramellina is a fossil from the Ediacaran discovered by Mikhail Fedonkin in 1980. The fossil has a leaf-like shape with short ridges, and lateral rollers.

Description 
Ramellina has a leaf-like shape with shorter ridges extending on both sides of almost right angles, arranged alternating lateral rollers and width close to that of the axial roller. There are widened distal ends that have the length longest in the middle of the colony, and shortest at the ends, which gives the leaf shape to the colony. One end of the colony is pointed, and the other is rounded. There may be a growth zone in the colony suggested by secondary lateral processes. These lateral processes are thin and have a sharper angle between them, the axial lateral outgrowths are sharper than the middle of the colony. Ramellina has been assigned to the phylum Cnidaria by J. Sepkoski.

Diversity 
Ramellina pennata, the only species in the genus, was discovered by M. Fedonkin in 1980 in Zimnii Bereg, White Sea, Russia.

See also 
 List of Ediacaran genera

References 

Ediacaran life
Cnidarian genera